Richard Kinder (born October 19, 1944) is an American businessman. He is the co-founder and executive chairman of Kinder Morgan Inc., an energy and pipeline corporation.

Early life
Richard Kinder was born in Cape Girardeau, Missouri, in 1944. He received a BA in 1966 and a JD in 1968, both from the University of Missouri. In college, he was a member of the Sigma Nu fraternity.

Career
He began his career in the energy business as an attorney with Florida Gas Transmission, which eventually became Enron Corporation, after a series of mergers He had been friends with its founder, Kenneth Lay, in college. From 1990 to December 1996, he served as its president and COO. He resigned from Enron in 1996 to start a new pipeline company with college friend William V. Morgan. They purchased Enron Liquids Pipeline for $40 million. They also merged with KN Energy. After a number of acquisitions, the most prominent being El Paso Corporation, Kinder Morgan became the largest midstream energy company in North America.

He is the chairman of the board of trustees of the Museum of Fine Arts, Houston and serves as chairman of the Kinder Foundation. He previously served as a member of the board of Baker Hughes, Transocean and Waste Management, as a national board member of the Smithsonian Institution and is a past chairman of the Interstate Natural Gas Association of America. A Republican, he campaigned for Bush-Quayle in 1992, for Bush-Cheney in 2004, for John McCain in 2008, and for Kay Bailey Hutchison and Tom DeLay.

In 2014, Kinder was listed on Forbes Richest People in the US. Kinder is one of seven self-made billionaires from Houston on the list, with a net worth of $11 billion. In 2020, he was ranked No. 103 on the Forbes 400 list of the richest people in America.

Personal life
He is twice married, with one child from his first marriage. His divorce was in 1996, the same year he left Enron, and he immediately married Nancy McNeil who was Ken Lay's assistant until Lay's death in 2006 and was a member of Rudy Giuliani's presidential committee from 2007 to 2008. He lives in Houston, Texas.

Kinder Foundation
The Kinders founded the Kinder Foundation in an effort to support education and the Greater Houston area by promoting preservation and accessibility to parks and green space. Through the foundation, the Kinders donated $15 million to Rice University in 2010 to support and rename the Kinder Institute for Urban Research, formerly Rice's Institute for Urban Research.

The foundation has funded projects that include the Bush Center at Southern Methodist University, the Texas Heart Institute and the Houston Food Bank.

In October 2013, it was announced that the foundation would give $50 million to the Houston Parks Board for the Bayou Greenways 2020 Project, which connects greenspaces along Houston's bayous and creates parkland.

In 2014, the Kinder Foundation made possible the Kinder Forum on Constitutional Democracy at the University of Missouri, a program "to support excellence in the teaching and study of American constitutional and democratic traditions". In 2015, the foundation made an endowed gift of $25 million to MU to provide permanent support for the renamed Kinder Institute on Constitutional Democracy.  Also, the Kinder Foundation committed a principal gift of $50 million to the Museum of Fine Arts, Houston for the redevelopment of its 14-acre campus which was unveiled in January 2015.

In October 2016, the Kinder Foundation obtained perpetual naming rights to Houston's High School for the Performing and Visual Arts for $7.5 million. The contract was approved by the school board after the Kinder Foundation said it would withdraw the funds if the board did not vote, six days after the public announcement of the deal. In April 2017, in response to a petition asking the Kinders to give the name back, Kinder wrote to the Superintendent of Houston Independent School District. Citing the negative controversy, he offered to release the naming rights but did not request or suggest that the original name be restored. The issue is unresolved. The name change will be effective when the new downtown school building is occupied, expected in January 2019.

Political activities
In 2015, Kinder and his wife Nancy donated $2 million to a Super PAC supporting Republican presidential candidate Jeb Bush.

References

American energy industry executives
American philanthropists
1944 births
Living people
Kinder Morgan
American billionaires
Businesspeople from Missouri
Businesspeople from Texas
Enron people
Giving Pledgers
21st-century philanthropists
People from Cape Girardeau, Missouri
Missouri Republicans
Texas Republicans
University of Missouri alumni